"Tears Run Rings" is a 1988 song by English musician Marc Almond from his 1988 album The Stars We Are. Some early pressings of the 12" single were red. These pressings were released in 1987 as opposed to the regular 1988 release of the single. The song has been considered Almond's most overtly political song he released. As a solo artist, it was his only song to chart in the United States, reaching number 67 in early 1989. Despite this, the song was popular in Europe and charted in a few European countries. A re-release of The Stars We Are included a DVD featuring both music videos for "Tears Run Rings", one for the UK and one for the US.

Charts

References

1988 songs
1988 singles
Marc Almond songs
Songs written by Marc Almond
Parlophone singles
Capitol Records singles
EMI Records singles